Eugene Patrick Foley (November 22, 1928 – December 30, 2015) was an American political strategist who served as Administrator of the Small Business Administration from 1963 to 1965.  He left to become the Assistant Secretary of Commerce in charge of the Economic Development Administration in October 1965  for a year before leaving government. His work at the EDA was covered in books such as "Oakland's Not for Burning" 1968 by Amory Bradford and he wrote of it in "The Achieving Ghetto" (1968).  On leaving the EDA in 1966 he said "because I could see the way the wind was blowing. Commerce was cracking down on EDA--the White House had decided that EDA should not be spending money in cities. Vietnam was eating everything up."

He ran for a Congressional seat in MN as a DFL candidate in 1958, but lost.

He died of natural causes on December 30, 2015, in Whitefish, Montana at age 87.

References

1928 births
2015 deaths
Administrators of the Small Business Administration
Minnesota Democrats